Lucien Norbert Nedzi (born May 28, 1925) is an American attorney and politician who served as a member of the United States House of Representatives from 1961 to 1981.

Early life and education
Nedzi was born in Hamtramck, Michigan, a city surrounded on all sides by Detroit. Nedzi is of Polish descent. He graduated from the University of Michigan in 1943. In 1951, he earned a Juris Doctor from the University of Detroit School of Law. He was admitted to the Michigan bar in January 1952. He later graduated from the National War College and Naval War College.

Career

Military service
From 1944 to 1946, he served in the United States Army during World War II as an infantryman in the Philippines, and in the Corps of Engineers in Japan. From 1946 to 1953, he was in the active United States Army Reserve, during which time he served in the Korean War.

Politics
He served as the public administrator of Wayne County, Michigan from 1955 to 1961.

Nedzi was elected as a Democrat from Michigan's 1st congressional district to the 87th United States Congress in a special election in 1961 to fill the vacancy left by resigning United States Representative Thaddeus M. Machrowicz. He was re-elected in the 1962 election and two years later he was elected from the 14th district and every two years after that until he declined to seek re-election in the 1980 election. In all, he served from November 7, 1961 to January 3, 1981.

Nedzi chaired the House Select Committee on Intelligence, known as the Nedzi Committee, from February 1975 until he controversially resigned in June. The committee's work was continued by the Pike Committee. In addition, Nedzi chaired the Joint Committee on the Library from 1973 to 1979 and the Committee on House Administration from 1979 to 1981.

Personal life
Nedzi lived in McLean, Virginia with his wife Margaret, until her death on November 1, 2020.

References

External links

1925 births
Living people
American politicians of Polish descent
United States Army personnel of World War II
Democratic Party members of the United States House of Representatives from Michigan
United States Army personnel of the Korean War
University of Michigan Law School alumni
University of Detroit Mercy alumni
People from Hamtramck, Michigan
Military personnel from Michigan
United States Army reservists
American expatriates in the Philippines
American expatriates in Japan